The following is a list of squads for each nation competing in 2017 EAFF E-1 Football Championship Final in Tokyo, Japan. Each nation must submit a squad of 23 players, including 3 goalkeepers.

Age, caps and goals as of the start of the tournament, 9 December 2017.

Head coach:  Marcello Lippi

Sources:

Head coach:  Vahid Halilhodžić

Sources:

Head coach:  Jørn Andersen

Sources:

Head coach: Shin Tae-yong

 

Source:

References

EAFF E-1 Football Championship squads